Ities (Greek: Ιτιές, meaning: willows) is a suburb in the southern part of the city of Patras.  The origin of the name comes from the willow tree which used to be plentiful in the area. Until 1900, the area, which was the small swamp, was drained.

Nearest places
 Anapirika Iteon, north
 Kokkinos Milos, south
 Krya Iteon, north
 Lefka, east
 Paralia, south

References

External links
Photos:
1903, 1906, or 1910

Notice
The first version of the article is translated from the article at the Greek Wikipedia (el:Main Page)

Neighborhoods in Patras